Kåre Olav Berg (April 9, 1944 – February 24, 2007) was a Norwegian nordic skier who competed in the 1960s and 1970s. Competing as a ski jumper at the 1960 Winter Olympics in Squaw Valley, he finished 13th in the individual large hill event. At the 1968 and 1972 Winter Olympics, Berg competed as a nordic combined skier, finishing 28th in 1968 and eighth in 1972.

External links
Olympic nordic combined results: 1968-84
Olympic ski jumping results: 1948-60
Kåre Olav Berg's profile at Sports Reference.com

Nordic combined skiers at the 1960 Winter Olympics
Nordic combined skiers at the 1968 Winter Olympics
Nordic combined skiers at the 1972 Winter Olympics
Norwegian male Nordic combined skiers
Norwegian male ski jumpers
1944 births
2007 deaths
20th-century Norwegian people